Pierre Jules Théophile Gautier (30 August 1811 – 23 October 1872) was a French poet, dramatist, novelist, journalist, and art and literary critic.

While an ardent defender of Romanticism, Gautier's work is difficult to classify and remains a point of reference for many subsequent literary traditions such as Parnassianism, Symbolism, Decadence and Modernism. He was widely esteemed by writers as disparate as Balzac, Baudelaire, the Goncourt brothers, Flaubert, Pound, Eliot, James, Proust and Wilde.

Life and times
Gautier was born on 30 August 1811 in Tarbes, capital of Hautes-Pyrénées département (southwestern France). His father was Jean-Pierre Gautier, a fairly cultured minor government official, and his mother was Antoinette-Adelaïde Cocard. The family moved to Paris in 1814, taking up residence in the ancient Marais district.

Gautier's education commenced at the prestigious Collège Louis-le-Grand in Paris (fellow alumni include Voltaire, Charles Baudelaire, Victor Hugo, and the Marquis de Sade), which he attended for three months before being brought home due to illness. Although he completed the remainder of his education at Collège Charlemagne (alumni include Charles Augustin Sainte-Beuve), Gautier's most significant instruction came from his father, who prompted him to become a Latin scholar by age eighteen.

While at school, Gautier befriended Gérard de Nerval and the two became lifelong friends. It is through Nerval that Gautier was introduced to Victor Hugo, by then already a well-known, established leading dramatist and author of Hernani. Hugo became a major influence on Gautier and is credited for giving him, an aspiring painter at the time, an appetite for literature. It was at the legendary premiere of Hernani that Gautier is remembered for wearing his anachronistic red doublet.

In the aftermath of the 1830 Revolution, Gautier's family experienced hardship and was forced to move to the outskirts of Paris. Deciding to experiment with his own independence and freedom, Gautier chose to stay with friends in the Doyenné district of Paris, living a rather pleasant bohemian life.

Towards the end of 1830, Gautier began to frequent meetings of Le Petit Cénacle (The Little Upper Room), a group of artists who met in the studio of Jehan Du Seigneur. The group was a more irresponsible version of Hugo's Cénacle. The group counted among its members the artists Gérard de Nerval, Alexandre Dumas, père, Petrus Borel, Alphonse Brot, Joseph Bouchardy and Philothée O’Neddy (real name Théophile Dondey). Le Petit Cénacle soon gained a reputation for extravagance and eccentricity, but also for being a unique refuge from society.

Gautier began writing poetry as early as 1826, but the majority of his life was spent as a contributor to various journals, mainly La Presse, which also gave him the opportunity for foreign travel and for meeting many influential contacts in high society and in the world of the arts. Throughout his life, Gautier was well-traveled, taking trips to Spain, Italy, Russia, Egypt and Algeria. Gautier's many travels inspired many of his writings including Voyage en Espagne (1843), Trésors d’Art de la Russie (1858), and Voyage en Russie (1867). Gautier's travel literature is considered by many as being some of the best from the nineteenth century; often written in a personal style, it provides a window into Gautier's own tastes in art and culture.

Gautier was a celebrated abandonné (one who yields or abandons himself to something) of the Romantic Ballet, writing several scenarios, the most famous of which is Giselle, whose first interpreter, the ballerina Carlotta Grisi, was the great love of his life. When Carlotta rebuffed him, he began a longterm relationship and had two daughters with her sister Ernestina, a singer.

Absorbed by the 1848 Revolution, Gautier wrote almost one hundred articles, equivalent to four large books, within nine months in 1848. In his essay La République de l'avenir, he celebrated the advent of the new republic and the onward march of individual liberty. Gautier experienced a prominent time in his life when the original romantics such as Hugo, François-René de Chateaubriand, Alphonse de Lamartine, Alfred de Vigny and Alfred de Musset were no longer actively participating in the literary world. His prestige was confirmed by his role as director of Revue de Paris from 1851 to 1856. During this time, Gautier left La Presse and became a journalist for Le Moniteur universel, finding the burden of regular journalism quite unbearable and "humiliating". Nevertheless, Gautier acquired the editorship of the influential review L’Artiste in 1856. It is in this review that Gautier publicized Art for art's sake doctrines through many editorials.

The 1860s were years of assured literary fame for Gautier. Although he was rejected by the French Academy three times (1867, 1868, 1869), Charles-Augustin Sainte-Beuve, the most influential critic of the day, set the seal of approval on the poet by devoting no less than three major articles in 1863 to reviews of Gautier's entire published works. In 1865, Gautier was admitted into the prestigious salon of Princess Mathilde Bonaparte, cousin of Napoleon III and niece to Bonaparte. The Princess offered Gautier a sinecure as her librarian in 1868, a position that gave him access to the court of Napoleon III.

Elected in 1862 as chairman of the Société Nationale des Beaux-Arts, he was surrounded by a committee of important painters: Eugène Delacroix, Pierre Puvis de Chavannes, Édouard Manet, Albert-Ernest Carrier-Belleuse and Gustave Doré.

During the Franco-Prussian War, Gautier made his way back to Paris upon hearing of the Prussian advance on the capital. He remained with his family throughout the invasion and the aftermath of the Commune, eventually dying on 23 October 1872 due to a long-standing cardiac disease. Gautier was sixty-one years old. He is interred at the Cimetière de Montmartre in Paris.

In 1873, A. Lemerre published a collection memorial poems, Le Tombeau de Théophile Gautier, with homages by Anatole France, Victor Hugo, Algernon Swinburne, and many others.

Personal life

The young Gautier's appearance was "flamboyant…defying conventionality by his flowing hair and far-famed scarlet waistcoat."

In his youth, according to Edgar Saltus, Gautier was dashing, athletic, amorous, and mercurial:When he first set out to charm that gracious lady whose name is Fame, he was as fabulously handsome as a Merovingian prince. He was tall and robust; his hair was a wayward flood; his eyes were blue and victorious. He was the image of Young France. His strength was proverbial; he outdid Dante; he swam from Marseilles to the Chateau d’If, and then swam back. Had it been necessary, he would have breasted the Hellespont. But of that there was no need. There were hearts nearer home that he won without effort; women fell in love with him at once; the Muse smiled, and Glory stretched her hand. His conquests were so numerous that to give an exact account of them the historian would have to write in Latin. In comparison Mardoche was a Puritan; and yet, through a charming contradiction, no one has ever been better supplied with beliefs: he had no less than three hundred and sixty-five, one for every day in the calendar; and it was only on leap year that he allowed himself for twenty-four hours the privilege of believing in nothing at all.

From an affair with Eugénie Fort, he had a son,  (1836-1904). From a subsequent relationship with the singer Ernesta Grisi (sister of the dancer Carlotta Grisi, who rebuffed him), he had two daughters, Judith Gautier (1845-1917) and Estelle Gautier (1848-1914).

Despite his attraction to "mystery, legend, tradition, the picturesque and the imaginative," and the occational "excursion into the realms of the beyond," Gautier "was not a believer in religion or the supernatural."

Influences
Early in his life, Gautier befriended Gérard de Nerval, who influenced him greatly in his earlier poetry and also through whom he was introduced to Victor Hugo. He shared in Hugo's dissatisfaction with the theatrical outputs of the time and the use of the word "tragedy". Gautier admired Honoré de Balzac for his contributions to the development of French literature.

Gautier was influenced greatly by his friends as well, paying tribute to them in his writings. In fact, he dedicated his collection of Dernières Poésies to his many friends, including Hérbert, Madame de la Grangerie, Maxime Du Camp and Princess Mathilde Bonaparte.

Criticism
Gautier spent the majority of his career as a journalist at La Presse and later on at Le Moniteur universel. He saw journalistic criticism as a means to a middle-class standard of living. The income was adequate and he had ample opportunities to travel. Gautier began contributing art criticism to obscure journals as early as 1831. It was not until 1836 that he experienced a jump in his career when he was hired by Émile de Girardin as an art and theatre columnist for La Presse. During his time at La Presse, however, Gautier also contributed nearly 70 articles to Le Figaro. After leaving La Presse to work for Le Moniteur universel, the official newspaper of the Second Empire, Gautier wrote both to inform the public and to influence its choices. His role at the newspaper was equivalent to the modern book or theatre reviewer. He also reviewed music, without technical terminology but with intelligence and insight, for instance into the work of his friend Berlioz, who set six of his poems (c. 1840) as 'Les Nuits d'été'.

Gautier's literary criticism was more reflective in nature, criticism which had no immediate commercial function but simply appealed to his own taste and interests. Later in his life, he wrote extensive monographs on such giants as Gérard de Nerval, Balzac and Baudelaire, who were also his friends – Baudelaire dedicated his chef-d’œuvre Les Fleurs du mal to him, describing him as "a perfect magician of French letters".

Art criticism
Gautier, who started off as a painter, contributed much to the world of art criticism. Instead of taking on the classical criticism of art that involved knowledge of color, composition and line, Gautier was strongly committed to Denis Diderot's idea that the critic should have the ability to describe the art such that the reader might "see" the art through his description. Many other critics of the generation of 1830 took on this theory of the transposition of art – the belief that one can express one art medium in terms of another. Although today Gautier is less well known as an art critic than his great contemporary, Baudelaire, he was more highly regarded by the painters of his time. In 1862 he was elected chairman of the Société Nationale des Beaux-Arts (National Society of Fine Arts) with a board which included Eugène Delacroix, Édouard Manet, Gustave Doré and Pierre Puvis de Chavannes.

Literary criticism
Gautier's literary criticism was more reflective in nature; his literary analysis was free from the pressure of his art and theatre columns and therefore, he was able to express his ideas without restriction. He made a clear distinction between prose and poetry, stating that prose should never be considered the equal of poetry. The bulk of Gautier's criticism, however, was journalistic. He raised the level of journalistic criticism of his day.

Theatre criticism
The majority of Gautier's career was spent writing a weekly column of theatrical criticism. Because Gautier wrote so frequently on plays, he began to consider the nature of the plays and developed the criteria by which they should be judged. He suggested that the normal five acts of a play could be reduced to three: an exposition, a complication, and a dénouement. Having abandoned the idea that tragedy is the superior genre, Gautier was willing to accept comedy as the equal of tragedy. Taking it a step further, he suggested that the nature of the theatrical effect should be in favour of creating fantasy rather than portraying reality because realistic theatre was undesirable.

Dance criticism
From a 21st-century standpoint Gautier's writings about dance are the most significant of his writings. The American writer Edwin Denby, widely considered the most significant writer about dance in the 20th century, called him "by common consent the greatest of ballet critics". Gautier, Denby says, "seems to report wholly from the point of view of a civilized entertainment seeker". He founds his judgments not on theoretical principles but in sensuous perception, starting from the physical form and vital energy of the individual dancer. This emphasis has remained a tacit touchstone of dance writing ever since.

Through his authorship of the scenario of the ballet Giselle, one of the foundation works of the dance repertoire, his influence remains as great among choreographers and dancers as among critics and balletomanes [devotees of ballet].

In 2011, Pacific Northwest Ballet presented a reconstruction of the work as close to its narrative and choreographic sources as possible, based on archival materials dating back to 1842, the year after its premiere.

Works

In many of Gautier's works, the subject is less important than the pleasure of telling the story. He favored a provocative yet refined style. This list links each year of publication with its corresponding "[year] in poetry" article, for poetry, or "[year] in literature" article for other works):

Poetry
Poésies, published in 1830, is a collection of 42 poems that Gautier composed at the age of 18. However, as the publication took place during the July Revolution, no copies were sold and it was eventually withdrawn. In 1832, the collection was reissued with 20 additional poems under the name Albertus. Another edition in 1845 included revisions of some of the poems. The poems are written in a wide variety of verse forms and show that Gautier attempts to imitate other, more established Romantic poets such as Sainte-Beuve, Alphonse de Lamartine, and Hugo, before Gautier eventually found his own way by becoming a critic of Romantic excesses.
Albertus, written in 1831 and published in 1832, is a long narrative poem of 122 stanzas, each consisting of 12 lines of alexandrine (12-syllable) verse, except for the last line of each stanza, which is octosyllabic. Albertus is a parody of Romantic literature, especially of tales of the macabre and the supernatural. The poem tells a story of an ugly witch who magically transforms at midnight into an alluring young woman. Albertus, the hero, falls deeply in love and agrees to sell his soul.
Les Jeunes-France ("The Jeunes-France: Tales Told with Tongue in Cheek"), published in 1833, was a satire of Romanticism. In 1831, the newspaper Le Figaro featured a number of works by the young generation of Romantic artists and published them in the Jeunes-France.
La Comédie de la Mort (Fr), published in 1838, is a period piece much like Albertus. In this work, Gautier focuses on the theme of death, which for Gautier is a terrifying, stifling and irreversible finality. Unlike many Romantics before him, Gautier's vision of death is solemn and portentous, proclaiming death as the definitive escape from life's torture. During the time he wrote the work, Gautier was frequenting many cemeteries, which were then expanding rapidly to accommodate the many deaths from epidemics that swept the country. Gautier translates death into a curiously heady, voluptuous, almost exhilarating experience which diverts him momentarily from the gruesome reality and conveys his urgent plea for light over darkness, life over death. Several of these poems have been set as melodies by composers such as Berlioz, Bizet, Fauré, and Duparc.
España (1845) is usually considered the transitional volume between the two phases of Gautier's poetic career. Inspired by the author's summer 1840 visit to Spain, the 43 miscellaneous poems in the collection cover topics including the Spanish language and aspects of Spanish culture and traditions such as music and dance.
Émaux et Camées ("Enamels and Cameos", 1852), published when Gautier was touring the Middle East, is considered his supreme poetic achievement. The title reflects Gautier's abandonment of the romantic ambition to create a kind of "total" art involving the emotional participation of the reader, in favour of a more modern approach focusing more on the poetic composition's form instead of its content. Originally a collection of 18 poems in 1852, its later editions contained up to 37 poems. (The 2nd "augmented" edition of "Enamels and Cameos", translated into English by Sunny Lou Publishing, ISBN 978-1-95539-232-7, 2022.)
Dernières Poésies (1872) is a collection of poems that range from earlier pieces to unfinished fragments composed shortly before Gautier's death. This collection is dominated by numerous sonnets dedicated to many of his friends.

Plays
Gautier did not consider himself to be a dramatist but more of a poet and storyteller. His plays were limited because of the time in which he lived; during the Revolution of 1848, many theaters were closed down and therefore plays were scarce. Most of the plays that dominated the mid-century were written by playwrights who insisted on conformity and conventional formulas and catered to cautious middle-class audiences. As a result, most of Gautier's plays were never published or reluctantly accepted.

Between the years 1839 and 1850, Gautier wrote all or part of nine different plays:
 Un Voyage en Espagne (1843)
 La Juive de Constantine (1846)
 Regardez mais ne touchez pas (1847) — written less by Gautier than his collaborators.
 Pierrot en Espagne (1847) — Gautier's authorship is uncertain.
 L’Amour souffle où il veut (1850) — not completed
 Une Larme du diable (1839) ("The Devil's Tear") was written shortly after Gautier's trip to Belgium in 1836. The work is considered an imitation of a medieval mystery play, a type of drama popular in the 14th century. These plays were usually performed in churches because they were religious in nature. In Gautier's play God cheats a bit to win a bet with Satan. The play is humorous and preaches both in favour and against human love.
Le Tricorne enchanté (1845; "The Magic Hat") is a play set in the 17th century. The plot involves an old man named Géronte who wishes to marry a beautiful woman who is in love with another man. After much scheming, the old man is duped and the lovers are married.
 La Fausse Conversion (1846) ("The False Conversion") is a satirical play written in prose. It was published in the Revue des Deux Mondes on 1 March. As with many other Gautier plays, the drama was not performed in his lifetime. It takes place in the 18th century, before the social misery that preceded the French Revolution. La Fausse Conversion is highly antifeminist and expresses Gautier's opinion that a woman must be a source of pleasure for man or frozen into art.
Pierrot Posthume (1847) is a brief comedic fantasy inspired by the Italian Commedia dell'arte, popular in France since the 16th century. It involved a typical triangle and ends happily ever after.

Novels

 Mademoiselle de Maupin (1835) In September 1833, Gautier was solicited to write a historical romance based on the life of French opera star Mlle. Maupin, who was a first-rate swordswoman and often went about disguised as a man. Originally, the story was to be about the historical La Maupin, who set fire to a convent for the love of another woman, but later retired to a convent herself, shortly before dying in her thirties. Gautier instead turned the plot into a simple love triangle between a man, d'Albert, and his mistress, Rosette, who both fall in love with Madelaine de Maupin, who is disguised as a man named Théodore. The message behind Gautier's version of the infamous legend is the fundamental pessimism about the human identity, and perhaps the entire Romantic age. The novel consists of seventeen chapters, most in the form of letters written by d'Albert or Madelaine. Most critics focus on the preface of the novel, which preached about art for art's sake through its dictum that "everything useful is ugly".
 Eldorado, ou Fortunio (1837) Serialized in Le Figaro in 1837; published as a book in 1838. Translated as Fortunio by 1907. An absurdist, decadent, and Orientalist fantasy story that takes place in Paris and revolves around the mysterious man Fortunio, raised in India, and his French love Musidora.
 Le Roman de La Momie (1858) Translated as The Romance of a Mummy in 1863. A historical novel set in Ancient Egypt, which features the Biblical Exodus.
 Captain Fracasse (1863) This book was promised to the public in 1836 but finally published in 1863. The novel represents a different era and is a project that Gautier had wanted to complete earlier in this youth. It is centered on a soldier named Fracasse whose adventures portray bouts of chivalry, courage and a sense of adventure. Gautier places the story in his favourite historical era, that of Louis XIII. It is best described as a typical cloak-and-dagger fairy tale where everyone lives happily ever after.

Short stories
 La Morte Amoureuse (1836) Classic tale of the supernatural in which a priest receives nocturnal visitations from a female vampire. Reprinted by Valde Books as Clarimonde.
 One of Cleopatra's Nights and Other Fantastic Romances (1882) Collection of six of his short stories in English translation by Lafcadio Hearn.

Travel books
 The travels of Théophile Gautier – 4 Volumes.

The travels of Théophile Gautier Vol 4
Travels in Russia Vol 1

Gautier in fiction
Two poems from "Émaux et camées"—"Sur les lagunes" and the second of two titled "Études de Mains"—are featured in Oscar Wilde's The Picture of Dorian Gray. Dorian reads them out of the book shortly after Basil Hallward's murder.

Ernest Fanelli's Tableaux Symphoniques are based on Gautier's novel Le Roman de la Momie.

In Peter Whiffle by Carl Van Vechten, the main character Peter Whiffle cites Gautier as a great influence and writer, among others.

Chronology of works

 1830: Poésies (Vol. I).
 1831: first article in Le Mercure de France au XIXe siècle.
 1832: Albertus.
 1833: Les Jeunes France, Romans Goguenards.
 1834-5: published articles which will later form Les Grotesques.
 1835-6: Mademoiselle de Maupin.
 1836: published "Fortunio" under the title "El Dorado".
 1836: La Morte Amoureuse.
 1838: La Comédie de la Mort.
 1839: Une Larme du Diable.
 1840: Le Pied de Momie.
 1841: premiere of the ballet, Giselle.
 1843: Voyage en Espagne | premiere of ballet, La Péri.
 1845: Poésies (complete) | first performance of comedy "Le Tricorne Enchanté".
 1847: first performance of comedy "Pierrot Posthume".
 1851: premiere of the ballet, Pâquerette.
 1852: Un Trio de Romans | Caprices et Zigzag | Emaux et Camées | Italia.
 1853: Constantinople.
 1851: premiere of the ballet, Gemma.
 1855: Les Beaux-Arts en Europe.
 1856: L’Art Moderne.
 1858: Le Roman de la Momie | Honoré de Balzac.
 1858-9: Histoire de l’Art Dramatique en France depuis Vingt-cinq Ans.
 1861: Trésors d’Art de la Russie Ancienne et Moderne.
 1863: Le Captaine Fracasse | Romans et Contes.
 1863: De Profundis Morpionibus | Gautier preferred to keep that satirical work anonymous.
 1865: Loin de Paris.
 1867: Voyage en Russie.
 1871: Tableaux de Siège: Paris 1870–1871.
 1872: Emaux et Camées | Théâtre | Histoire du Romantisme.

References

Sources
 Denby, Edwin (1998). Dance Writings and Poetry. New Haven: Yale University Press. .
 Grant, Richard (1975). Théophile Gautier. Boston, Mass.: Twayne Publishers. .
 Gautier, Théophile; Ivor Guest, ed. (2008). Gautier on Dance. London: Dance Books. .
 Gautier, Théophile; F.C. de Sumichrast, trans., ed., introduction (1912), The Romances of Théophile Gautier, Volume Five, Boston: Little, Brown & Company.
 Gilman, Daniel Coit, editor (1902). Gautier, Théophile" in New International Encyclopedia, Volume VIII, New York: Dodd, Mead and Company, pp. 161-162.
 Richardson, Joanna (1958). Théophile Gautier: His Life and Times. London: Max Reinhardt.
 Saltus, Edgar Everett (1887). "Introduction" (pp. 9-30) to Tales Before Supper from Théophile Gautier and Prosper Mérimée, translated by Myndart Verelst, New York: Brentano's.
 Tennant, Phillip Ernest (1975). Théophile Gautier. London: the Athlone Press. .

Further reading
 Barton, F.B. (1918). "Laurence Sterne and Théophile Gautier," Modern Philology, Vol. 16, No. 4, pp. 205–212.
 Du Camp, Maxime (1893). Théophile Gautier. London: T. Fisher Unwin.
 Gide, André (1959). "Théophile Gautier." In: Pretexts: Reflections on Literature and Morality. New York: Meridan Books, pp. 251–254.
 Guest, Ivor (1987). "Théophile Gautier on Spanish Dancing," Dance Chronicle, Vol. 10, No. 1, pp. 1–104.
 Hartman, Elwood (1973). "Théophile Gautier on Progress in the Arts," Studies in Romanticism, Vol. 12, No. 2, pp. 530–550.
 Henry, Freeman G. (1994). "A Case of Questionable Motives: Théophile Gautier and 'La Gazette des Femmes'," Nineteenth-Century French Studies, Vol. 22, No. 3/4, pp. 431–438.
 James, Henry (1878). "Theophile Gauthier." In: French Poets and Novelists. London: Macmillan & Co., pp. 39–71.
 Huneker, James (1921). "Gautier the Journalist." In: The Pathos of Distance. New York: Charles Scribner's Sons, pp. 264–272.
 Kearns, James (2007). Theophile Gautier, Orator to the Artists. Art Journalism in the Second Republic. London: Legenda.
 Nebel, Cecile (1997). "Théophile Gautier and the Wilis," Dalhousie French Studies, Vol. 39/40, pp. 89–99.
 Nelson, Hilda (1972). "Théophile Gautier: The Invisible and Impalpable World: A Demi-Conviction," The French Review, Vol. 45, No. 4, pp. 819–830.
 Saintsbury, George (1891). "Théophile Gauthier." In: Essays on French Novelists. London: Percival & Co., pp. 225–262.
 
 Schick, Joseph S. (1933). "William Cullen Bryant and Théophile Gautier," The Modern Language Journal, Vol. 17, No. 4, pp. 260–267.
 Shanks, Lewis Piaget (1912). "Théophile Gautier," The Sewanee Review, Vol. 20, No. 2, pp. 167–174.
 Smith, Horatio E. (1917). "The Brief-Narrative Art of Théophile Gautier," Modern Philology, Vol. 14, No. 11, pp. 647–664.
 Spencer, Michael (1968). "Théophile Gautier, Music Critic," Music & Letters, Vol. 49, No. 1, pp. 4–17.
 Spink, Gerald W. (1960). "Théophile Gautier's Architectural Tastes," The Modern Language Review,'' Vol. 55, No. 3, pp. 345–350.
 Theophile Gautier's book on Gallica

External links

 Gautier's Love of Cats
 
 
 
 Works by Théophile Gautier, at Hathi Trust
 
 
 

1811 births
1872 deaths
People from Tarbes
Occitan people
19th-century French novelists
French ballet librettists
19th-century French dramatists and playwrights
French fantasy writers
French historical novelists
French literary critics
19th-century French poets
French theatre critics
Writers from Occitania (administrative region)
19th-century French journalists
French male journalists
19th-century French male writers
Writers of historical fiction set in antiquity
Lycée Louis-le-Grand alumni
Burials at Montmartre Cemetery
Le Figaro people